APBS may refer to:

 Aadhaar Payments Bridge System, a payment system in India which uses Aadhaar numbers
 Advanced Poisson-Boltzmann Solver, a continuum electrostatics equations solver